The Calliope Dock is a historical stone dry dock on the grounds of the Devonport Naval Base, in Devonport, Auckland, New Zealand. It was built in 1888 to service ships of the British Royal Navy, and is still in use today.

It was extended in 1936, 1943 (to ) and again in 1996.

History
After it was found that the Auckland Graving Dock on the Auckland waterfront was too small to be an effective dry dock, work on the Calliope Dock began in December 1884, taking over three years to complete. Among the 300 labourers who constructed the dock, many were Māori, and whare were constructed to the west of the dock as a temporary village. The structure required 1.5 million bricks, which were made locally.

The dock was officially opened in February 1888. At the time of its construction, it was the largest in the Southern Hemisphere, and a strategic asset for the Royal Navy. It was named for Calliope Point, out of which it had been hewn by hand over three years. Coincidentally, one of the two first ships to enter it (as a show of her capacity) was HMS Calliope. Administered at first by the Auckland Harbour Board, by 1899 the dock and wharf had become underused and needed widescale maintenance. The Board struck a deal with the Royal Navy for primary use of the dock. This led to the Auckland naval base moving from Torpedo Bay to Devonport, into a swamp area next to the dock.

After World War I, the Royal Navy expanded the facilities in the area, including work to extend the dock and create more workshops to service the fleet. On 26 February 1987, the Royal New Zealand Navy (the successor to the Royal Navy in New Zealand) purchased the dock from the Harbour Board for $650,000.

References

External links
Photographs of Calliope Dock held in Auckland Libraries' heritage collections.

Royal New Zealand Navy
Buildings and structures in Auckland
Drydocks
1880s architecture in New Zealand
Waitematā Harbour